KZSQ-FM (92.7 FM, "The New Star 92.7 FM") is a radio station licensed to Sonora, California. The New Star 92.7 KZSQ Serves the greater Mother Lode area centered in Sonora, comprising Tuolumne and Calaveras Counties with a combined population of approximately 110,000.

The station broadcasts a classic hits format and is owned by Clarke Broadcasting Corporation.

The New Star 92.7 has been broadcasting in the Mother Lode since 1971. In February, 1994, KZSQ-FM and KVML updated to digital studios and relocated to downtown Sonora. In 2000, Clarke Broadcasting acquired a local Internet Service Provider, Mother Lode Internet, and created a community website, myMotherLode.com, for its three radio stations KVML/KZSQ-FM/KKBN. Mother Lode Internet was sold by Clarke Broadcasting in 2008, while retaining the myMotherLode.com with more than 2 million page views per month.  myMotherLode.com continues to promote and represent Star 92.7/KZSQ which does not stream all radio content but media feature segments are available on myMotherLode.com and KZSQ.com.

Clarke Broadcasting Corporation is a Nevada corporation, President H. Randolph Holder, Jr. The General Manager of KVML / KZSQ-FM / KKBN / myMotherlode.com is Tom Nankival.

History
On May 27, 2022 at 2 p.m., KZSQ-FM flipped its format from adult contemporary to classic hits, with music primarily from the top 40 music charts of the 60s to early 2000s, with a focus on the 80s, and has been branded as "The New Star 92.7".

References

External links
KZSQ-FM's official website
KSZQ Information and Radio Segments in Multimedia section of myMotherLode.com 

ZSQ-FM
Classic hits radio stations in the United States
Mass media in Tuolumne County, California
Sonora, California